Kenza Wahbi (born 4 February 1971) is a retired Moroccan long-distance runner who specialized in the marathon.

She was born in El Kelaa des Sraghna. She competed at the 2003 World Championships, the 2003 World Half Marathon Championships, the 2004 World Cross Country Championships, the 2004 Olympic Games, the 2004 World Half Marathon Championships, and the 2005 World Championships. Her best placement was 30th at the 2004 Olympics.

Her personal best times were 1:14:05 hours in the half marathon and 2:36:29 minutes in the marathon, both in 2003.

Achievements

References

1971 births
Living people
Moroccan female long-distance runners
Moroccan female marathon runners
Athletes (track and field) at the 2004 Summer Olympics
Olympic athletes of Morocco
People from El Kelaa des Sraghna